Huntington Station is a hamlet and census-designated place (CDP) in the Town of Huntington in Suffolk County, on Long Island, in New York. The population was 33,029 at the 2010 census.

History 
The hamlet was named for its railroad station, and was originally known as "Fairground".

Huntington Station was the birthplace of poet Walt Whitman. His home remains there as a museum.

Economy 
Across from the Walt Whitman Museum on Route 110 are the Walt Whitman Shops, a large shopping mall.

Geography

Demographics of the CDP

As of the census of 2010, there were 33,029 people, 10,067 households, and 7,449 families residing in the CDP. The population density was 6,005.3 per square mile (2,326.0/km2). There were 10,523 housing units at an average density of 1,913.3/sq mi (741.1/km2). The racial makeup of the CDP was 64.0% White, 10.9% African American, 0.6% Native American, 3.5% Asian, 0.02% Pacific Islander, 16.4% some other race, and 4.6% from two or more races. Hispanic or Latino of any race were 36.7% of the population.

There were 10,067 households, out of which 40.8% had children under the age of 18 living with them, 51.4% were headed by married couples living together, 15.6% had a female householder with no husband present, and 26.0% were non-families. 19.2% of all households were made up of individuals, and 7.0% were someone living alone who was 65 years of age or older. The average household size was 3.26, and the average family size was 3.56.

In the CDP, the population was spread out, with 24.7% under the age of 18, 9.3% from 18 to 24, 30.6% from 25 to 44, 25.4% from 45 to 64, and 10.0% who were 65 years of age or older. The median age was 35.4 years. For every 100 females, there were 104.4 males. For every 100 females age 18 and over, there were 102.5 males.

For the period 2009–2011, the median annual income for a household in the CDP was $70,898, and the median income for a family was $77,674. Males had a median income of $46,600 versus $47,162 for females. The per capita income for the CDP was $29,598. About 7.2% of families and 12.1% of the population were below the poverty line, including 19.0% of those under age 18 and 6.3% of those age 65 or over.

Education 
Huntington Station is located within the boundaries of (and is thus served by) the Harborfields Central School District, the Huntington Union Free School District, and the South Huntington Union Free School District. As such, children who reside within the hamlet and attend public schools go to school in one of these three districts, depending on where they reside within the hamlet.

Transportation
The hamlet is a major hub for the area. It is the beginning point of electrification for the Port Jefferson Branch of the Long Island Rail Road, and so many New York-bound trains start at Huntington station. The hamlet also has the S1 bus (operated by Suffolk County Transit), providing service along Route 110. In addition, the Town of Huntington also operates Huntington Area Rapid Transit (HART) buses through the area, with the H10 & H20 buses serving the area near the LIRR Huntington station, while the H30 & H40 buses only serve the southern portion of the hamlet by Jericho Turnpike.

Notable people

Notable current and former residents of Huntington Station include:
 Gerry Cooney, former heavyweight boxer
 Diabolic, underground hip-hop artist and rapper
 Adam Ferrara, comedian
 Tom Gugliotta, former NBA forward with various teams
 Joseph Hazelwood, the ship's master of the Exxon Valdez at the time of the Exxon Valdez oil spill in the Prince William Sound, Alaska, on March 24, 1989
 Charlie Korsmo, former child actor, lawyer
 Latterman, punk rock band
A. J. Preller, GM of the San Diego Padres baseball team.
 Jim Wetherbee (born 1952), astronaut
 Walt Whitman, poet

References

Huntington, New York
Census-designated places in New York (state)
Hamlets in New York (state)
Census-designated places in Suffolk County, New York
Hamlets in Suffolk County, New York